Florence Brenzikofer (born 15 April 1975 in Binningen, Basel-Landschaft) is a politician of the Green Party of Switzerland who has been a member of the National Council since 2019.

Career
Brenzikofer enrolled at the University of Fribourg in 1996 studying art history and French literature and studied at Paris 8 University Vincennes-Saint-Denis for a year in 1998. She then trained to be a secondary school teacher at the University of Bern.

In 2019, Maya Graf was elected to both Basel-Landschaft's seat in the Council of States and one of its seats in the National Council. As Graf moved to sit in the Council of States, Brenzikofer took up the vacant seat in the National Council. She entered office on 9 December 2019.

Brenzikofer has supported local food initiatives, more affordable public transport for young people, and increased transparency in the Swiss banking sector.

See also
List of members of the Federal Assembly from the Canton of Basel-Landschaft
List of members of the National Council of Switzerland, 2019–23

References

1975 births
Living people
People from Basel-Landschaft
University of Fribourg alumni
University of Bern alumni
Paris 8 University Vincennes-Saint-Denis alumni
21st-century Swiss politicians
21st-century Swiss women politicians
Green Party of Switzerland politicians
Women members of the National Council (Switzerland)
Swiss schoolteachers
21st-century Swiss educators
21st-century women educators